Symphytocarpus is a genus of slime molds in the family Stemonitidaceae. , there are nine species in the genus.

Species
Symphytocarpus amaurochaetoides
Symphytocarpus confluens
Symphytocarpus cristatus
Symphytocarpus flaccidus
Symphytocarpus fusiformis
Symphytocarpus herbaticus
Symphytocarpus impexus
Symphytocarpus syncarpus
Symphytocarpus trechisporus

References

Myxogastria
Amoebozoa genera